The Bridgeport Islanders (previously known as the Bridgeport Sound Tigers) are a professional ice hockey team playing in the American Hockey League (AHL). They are the AHL affiliate of the National Hockey League's New York Islanders, who own the franchise. The team started in 2001–02 season and were purchased by the Islanders in 2004. The team is based in Bridgeport, Connecticut, and play their home games at the Total Mortgage Arena.

History

The Bridgeport Sound Tigers joined the American Hockey League as an expansion franchise in 2001 and were coached by Steve Stirling. The team's name referenced both the Long Island Sound where Bridgeport lies, and the circuses of former resident P. T. Barnum, with the Sound Tigers identity being unveiled at the Barnum Museum. In their inaugural season, the team won their division and had the best regular season record to win the Macgregor Kilpatrick Trophy. In the playoffs, they won Eastern Conference championship and the Richard F. Canning Trophy to advance to the Calder Cup finals against the Chicago Wolves. They lost the series four games-to-one.

In their second season, the team finished second in their division and the fifth conference seed in the playoffs. They advanced to the conference semifinals where they lost to their division champion Binghamton Senators in six games. Stirling was promoted to head coaching position with the New York Islanders and was replaced by Greg Cronin for 2003–04. As the Sound Tigers, the team then had limited success, missing the playoffs ten times and not winning a playoff round since their second season.

On May 10, 2021, it was announced that the team would change its name to the Bridgeport Islanders beginning with the 2021–22 season.

Team identity

Mascot
The lone mascot of the Sound Tigers is a anthropomorphic blue tiger named Storm. He appears at home games sporting a jersey with the number 01. While Storm can usually be found exciting fans throughout the arena, he skates on the ice during periodic intermissions. Storm's appearance has changed since the team's inaugural season. Storm has weathered the storm since the clubs change to the Islanders monicker and is a regular at home games.

Rivalries
The main (and instate) rival of the Islanders are the Hartford Wolf Pack, the AHL affiliate of the New York Rangers (the main rival of the Bridgeport Islanders' parent club, the New York Islanders). The games have become known as the Battle of Connecticut. They have formed a rivalry with the Wilkes-Barre/Scranton Penguins, the Pittsburgh Penguins' AHL affiliate, and the Providence Bruins, the Boston Bruins' AHL affiliate, largely due to the teams frequently facing off in playoff match-ups and regular season play. They also are semi-rivals with the Hershey Bears, the Washington Capitals' AHL affiliate.

Season-by-season results

Note: The AHL did not have qualifying rounds between 2005-2021.

Players

Current roster
Updated March 2, 2023.

|}

Team captains

Notes
 There were three captains for the 2004–05 season: Aldridge named on Oct. 16, 2004, Seeley named on Nov. 6, 2004, and Campbell named on Mar. 16, 2005
 There were two captains for the 2012–13 season: McDonald named on Dec. 7, 2012, and Watkins named on Feb. 22, 2013.
 There were two captains for the 2018–19 season: when Ben Holmstrom played, he wore the "C" on his sweater. When Holmstrom did not play, Kyle Burroughs wore the "C".

Team records
Single season
Goals: Jeff Hamilton, 43, (2003–04)
Assists: Rob Collins, 48, (2005–06)
Points: Jeff Tambellini, 76, (2007–08)
Penalty minutes: Eric Godard, 295, (2004–05)
GAA: Wade Dubielewicz, 1.38, (2003–04)
SV%: Wade Dubielewicz, .946, (2003–04)
C. AHL Records

Career
Career goals: Jeff Hamilton, 89
Career assists: Jeremy Colliton, 126
Career points: Jeremy Colliton, 203
Career penalty minutes: Brett Gallant, 857
Career goaltending wins: Wade Dubielewicz, 81
Career shutouts: Wade Dubielewicz, 15
Career games: Mark Wotton, 368

References

External links
Official website

 
Ice hockey in Bridgeport, Connecticut
New York Islanders minor league affiliates
Tourist attractions in Fairfield County, Connecticut
Ice hockey teams in Connecticut
Ice hockey clubs established in 2001
2001 establishments in Connecticut